Anatye may refer to.

Eastern Arrernte word for the Northern Australian plant, Ipomoea costata 
Anatye, Northern Territory, a locality in Australia
Anatye Aboriginal Land Trust, an area of aboriginal-owned land in the locality of Anatye, Northern Territory